Fanghua Road, formerly known as Hunan Road Station, is a station on Line 7 of the Shanghai Metro. It began operation on December 5, 2009. The station is located in Pudong New Area.

Railway stations in Shanghai
Line 7, Shanghai Metro
Railway stations in China opened in 2009
Shanghai Metro stations in Pudong